TasRail is the trading name of Tasmanian Railway Proprietary Limited, a Tasmanian Government state-owned enterprise that has operated the mainline railways in Tasmania since September 2009. It operates only freight services.

History
Established under the Rail Company Act 2009, in September 2009 the Tasmanian Government purchased the AN Tasrail business from Pacific National. TasRail combined the above-rail (rollingstock) and business assets with the below-rail assets (track and associated infrastructure), for which the state had assumed responsibility in May 2007, to form a vertically integrated rail operator.

The Tasmanian Government Railways had operated the state's railway network until it passed to the federal government's Australian National in March 1978.

Fleet
As at April 2017, the fleet consisted of 27 operational locomotives.

Current locomotive fleet

Former locomotive fleet

Road crossings
There are 199 level crossings on the TasRail network with active control at 123 crossings and passive control at the remainder. Active control includes flashing lights and warning bells that are activated by approaching trains and passive control includes 'Stop' or 'Give Way' sign which rely on motorists to watch for trains before crossing the railway line. During the period 2003 – 2012, there were 36 reported crashes at level crossings, with 20 resulting in casualties, 3 of which were fatal. Almost two thirds of crashes occurred within urban areas with speed limits 50 or 60 km/hr. Relocation of the Hobart terminal to Brighton during June 2014 meant that 29 crossings became inactive, which was expected to reduce level crossing crashes in Tasmania by 30%.

References

External links

Locomotive details

Government-owned companies of Tasmania
Railway infrastructure companies of Australia
Freight railway companies of Australia
Railway companies established in 2009
Rail transport in Tasmania
Australian companies established in 2009